Rosół is a traditional Polish soup based primarily on meat broth. Its most popular variety is the rosół z kury, or clear chicken soup. It is commonly served with capellini pasta. A vegetarian version can be made, substituting meat with oil or butter.

It is one of the most popular Polish soups, served during family dinners and a traditional soup for weddings; it is also a traditional cold remedy. The name "rosół" derives from a dish made of salted meat (an old conservation method) cooked in water to make it more edible. Later on, fresh meat was used instead. Over time the dish evolved to that of cooked meat in a soup that is commonly known today.

There are many types of rosół, as:
Rosół Królewski (royal rosół), made of three meats: beef or veal, white poultry (hen, turkey or chicken) and dark poultry as duck, goose (crop only), just a couple of dried king boletes, one single cabbage leaf and a variety of vegetables such as parsley, celery, carrot, and leek. The cooking must take at least six hours of sensitive boiling over a small fire. At the end, softly burnt onion is added to the soup.

Rosół myśliwski (The hunter's rosół) is made of a variety of wild birds as well as pheasant, capercaillie, wood grouse, black grouse, or grey partridge, with a small addition of roe deer meat, a couple of wild mushrooms, and 2–3 juniper fruits. Instead of wild poultry, helmeted guinea fowl can also be used.

The most important thing about making rosół is that there can be no addition of pork, since that would no longer make the broth clear. It cannot be boiled too quickly for the same reason.

Recipe
Take beef, veal,
hazel grouse or partridge,
Soak it, put into a pot, then strain and pour over meat, add parsley, butter, salt, and skim well.
Add parsley, dill, onion or garlic, nutmeg or rosemary or pepper to taste.
Lime may also be added.

References

Polish soups
Stock (food)